Unterberger is a German surname. Notable people with the surname include:
Andreas Unterberger, Austrian curler and coach
Anna Unterberger (born 1985), Italian actress
Betty Miller Unterberger (1922–2012), American historian and professor
Carola Unterberger-Probst (born 1978), Austrian media artist and philosopher of art
Christof Unterberger (born 1970), Austrian cellist and composer
Cristopher Unterberger (1732–1798), Italian painter
David Unterberger (born 1988), Austrian ski jumper
Ignaz Unterberger (1748–1797), Italian-Austrian painter and printmaker
Julia Unterberger (born 1962), Italian politician
Michelangelo Unterberger (1695–1758), Austrian painter
Richie Unterberger (born 1962), American author and journalist
 (1893–1979), Austrian university teacher

See also
Unterberger test, used in otolaryngology to help assess whether a patient has a vestibular pathology

German-language surnames